Song Weigang (born 5 May 1958) is a Chinese water polo player. He competed in the men's tournament at the 1984 Summer Olympics. He is from Zhanjiang.

References

1958 births
Living people
Chinese male water polo players
Olympic water polo players of China
Water polo players at the 1984 Summer Olympics
Place of birth missing (living people)
Asian Games medalists in water polo
Water polo players at the 1982 Asian Games
Medalists at the 1982 Asian Games
Asian Games gold medalists for China
Sportspeople from Guangdong
People from Zhanjiang
20th-century Chinese people